Choneteuthis tongaensis is a species of bobtail squid native to the waters around the Tonga Islands in the southern Pacific Ocean. It is known from only three specimens. Of these, the holotype is the largest, at 33.8 mm mantle length (ML). C. tongaensis is characterised by several distinct morphological features: the mantle is free from the head in the nuchal region, a large, circular visceral photophore and ventral shield are present on the ventral surface of the ink sac, and the broad keel extends the full length of the club.

The holotype (MNHN 3820), a female with missing tentacles, was collected in the N Ha’apai group of the Tonga Islands at a depth of 332 m. Paratype 1, a male known from only the head and brachial crown, came from the same station. Paratype 2 (MNHN 3822), also a female with missing tentacles, was collected from a seamount in the Tonga Islands at a depth of 385–405 m.

References

External links 
 Tree of Life web project: Choneteuthis tongaensis
 Choneteuthis tongaensis: Description continued

Bobtail squid
Molluscs described in 2006